Law for the Prevention of Genetically Diseased Offspring or "Sterilisation Law" was a statute in Nazi Germany enacted on July 14, 1933, (and made active in January 1934) which allowed the compulsory sterilisation of any citizen who in the opinion of a "Genetic Health Court" suffered from a list of alleged genetic disorders – many of which were not, in fact, genetic. The elaborate interpretive commentary on the law was written by three dominant figures in the racial hygiene movement: Ernst Rüdin,  and the lawyer .

While it has close resemblances with the American Model Eugenical Sterilization Law developed by Harry H. Laughlin, the law itself was initially drafted in 1932, at the end of the Weimar Republic period, by a committee led by the Prussian health board.

Operation of the law

The basic provisions of the 1933 law stated that:

The law applied to anyone in the general population, making its scope significantly larger than the compulsory sterilisation laws in the United States, which generally were only applicable on people in psychiatric hospitals or prisons.

The 1933 law created a large number of "Genetic Health Courts"  (EGG), consisting of a judge, a medical officer, and medical practitioner, which "shall decide at its own discretion after considering the results of the whole proceedings and the evidence tendered". If the court decided that the person in question was to be sterilised, the decision could be appealed to the "Higher Genetic Health Court" (EGOG). If the appeal failed, the sterilization was to be carried out, with the law specifying that "the use of force is permissible". The law also required that people seeking voluntary sterilizations also go through the courts.

There were three amendments by 1935, most making minor adjustments to how the statute operated or clarifying bureaucratic aspects (such as who paid for the operations). The most significant changes allowed the Higher Court to renounce a patient's right to appeal, and to fine physicians who did not report patients who they knew would qualify for sterilisation under the law. The law also enforced sterilization on the so-called "Rhineland bastards," the mixed-race children of German civilians and French African soldiers who helped occupy the Rhineland.

At the time of its enaction, the German government pointed to the success of sterilisation laws elsewhere, especially the work in California documented by the American eugenicists E. S. Gosney and Paul Popenoe, as evidence of the humaneness and efficacy of such laws. Eugenicists abroad admired the German law for its legal and ideological clarity. Popenoe himself wrote that "the German law is well drawn and, in form, may be considered better than the sterilization laws of most American states", and trusted in the German government's "conservative, sympathetic, and intelligent administration" of the law, praising the "scientific leadership" of the Nazis. The German mathematician Otfrid Mittmann defended the law against "unfavorable judgements".

In the first year of the law's operation, 1934, 84,600 cases were brought to Genetic Health Courts, with 62,400 forced sterilisations. Nearly 4,000 people appealed against the decisions of sterilisation authorities; 3,559 of the appeals failed. In 1935, it was 88,100 trials and 71,700 sterilizations. By the end of the Nazi regime, over 200 "Genetic Health Courts" were created, and under their rulings over 400,000 people were sterilized against their will.

Along with the law, Adolf Hitler personally decriminalised abortion in case of fetuses having racial or hereditary defects for doctors, while the abortion of healthy "pure" German, "Aryan" unborn remained strictly forbidden.

See also
 Life unworthy of life
 Aktion T4
 Nazi eugenics
 Eugenics in the United States
 Rhineland Bastard

Notes

External links
 "Eugenics in Germany : 'The Law for the Prevention of Hereditarily Diseased Offspring'" article from Facing History and Ourselves
 United States Holocaust Memorial Museum - The Biological State: Nazi Racial Hygiene, 1933-1939

1933 establishments in Germany
1933 in law
Law in Nazi Germany
Nazi eugenics
Race and intelligence controversy
Racial antisemitism
Scientific racism
Compulsory sterilization